Yael Lotan may refer to:

 Yael Lotan (volleyball) (born 1993), Israeli volleyball player
 Yael Lotan (writer) (1935–2009), Israeli writer and activist